26 Motorised Infantry Brigade (pronounced as Two Six Motorised Infantry Brigade) is a brigade of the Namibian Army based at Grootfontein.  The prefix "26" is taken from 26 August 1966, the day on which SWAPO guerrillas first encountered the South African security forces at Ongulumbashe. The brigade is responsible for defence of the Northern areas of Namibia. Its subordinate units are situated in Zambezi, Kavango, Omusati, Kunene and Oshana regions.

Equipment
The Brigade uses the following equipment:
Toyota Land Cruiser
Toyota Hilux
Ural Trucks

Units
The standard Namibian Infantry Brigade consists of a bde Headquarters,a transport coy, logistics coy and a medical coy supporting three Infantry battalions an artillery regiment and an air defence regiment.

261 Battalion
- Based in Rundu

262 Battalion
- Based in Katima Mulilo

263 Battalion
- Based in Oshakati

Leadership

References

Military of Namibia
Infantry brigades